Melanie Gabriella Hayrapetian, known as Melanie Wehbe, (born 2 December 1991) is a Swedish singer and songwriter.  She participated in Melodifestivalen 2023 with the song "For the Show". Melanie Wehbe is also a songwriter, having written songs like "Move" with The Mamas which won Melodifestivalen 2020.

Discography

Singles
2016 – "Wasted"
2018 – "Make Room"
2018 – "Forget You"
2019 – "Iron"
2019 – "Shy"
2020 – "Nothing"
2021 – "Sugarcoat"
2022 – "Like I Do"
2022 – "All the Rest"
2022 – "Bloom"
2023 – "Part of Me" (Lanné and Max Lean featuring Melanie Wehbe)

EPs
2022 – Bloom

References

1991 births
Living people
Melodifestivalen contestants of 2023